Kenneth Sanders  (born August 22, 1950) is a former American football defensive end who played 10 seasons in the National Football League (NFL), mainly for the Detroit Lions numbered 82. Sanders attended Howard Payne University.

External links
NFL.com player page

1950 births
Living people
Players of American football from Texas
American football offensive linemen
Howard Payne Yellow Jackets football players
Detroit Lions players
Minnesota Vikings players
People from Valley Mills, Texas